CFID-FM is a community radio radio station that broadcasts at 103.7 FM in Acton Vale, Quebec.

Owned by Radio Acton, the station was licensed in 2004.

References

External links
CFID 103,7 FM - Radio-Acton
CFID-FM history - Canadian Communication Foundation

Fid
Fid
Fid
Radio stations established in 2004
2004 establishments in Quebec
Acton Regional County Municipality